SABS may refer to:

 St. Andrews Biological Station, a Fisheries and Oceans Canada research centre
 Sultan Abu Bakar School (SABS), Kuantan
 Stabilized Automatic Bomb Sight, a World War II bombsight used by the RAF Bomber Command
 South African Boilermakers' Society, a former trade union
 South African Bureau of Standards
 Southern Appalachian Botanical Society
 Sisters of the Adoration of the Blessed Sacrament, a congregation of the Syro-Malabar Catholic Church, founded in 1908 by Thomas Kurialacherry

See also 
 Sabs, a rap album